Kjerulføya is an island north of Nordaustlandet in Svalbard, Norway. It is named for Theodor Kjerulf. The island is located within Nordaust-Svalbard Nature Reserve.

In the film Orion's Belt, Kjerulfsøya is the location of the Soviet bearing station.

References

Islands of Svalbard